If This Is A Woman: Inside Ravensbruck: Hitler's Concentration Camp for Women is a 2015 book by Sarah Helm about the Ravensbrück Concentration Camp.

Yvonne Roberts of The Observer wrote that the book's "title powerfully echoes If This Is a Man".

Background
Helm learned about the camp whilst writing about the British Special Operations Executive. Helm visited various countries to conduct research, including the France, Israel, the Netherlands, and Poland.

Reception
Joanna Bourke in The Daily Telegraph wrote that the author "never sensationalises" the "viciousness" of female guards and does not show a reluctance to illustrate "the surreal horror that overwhelmed prisoners, particularly when they first arrived at the camp." She rated the book five out of five stars.

References

2015 non-fiction books
Ravensbrück concentration camp
Little, Brown and Company books